Yinlu may refer to:

Yunlu (1695–1767), formally Prince Zhuang, imperial prince of the Qing dynasty, known as Yinlu before 1722
Yinlu Foods, a Chinese food and drink company

See also
Yin Lu (born 1989), Chinese footballer